Athletes from Trinidad and Tobago competed at the 1976 Summer Olympics in Montreal, Quebec, Canada. Thirteen competitors, all men, took part in ten events in three sports. This was Trinidad and Tobago's first Olympic gold medal victory.

Medalists

Gold
 Hasely Crawford — Athletics, Men's 100 metres

Athletics

Men's 800 metres
 Horace Tuitt
 Heat — did not finish (→ did not advance)

Men's 4x100 metres Relay
Anthony Husbands, Chris Brathwaite, Charles Joseph, and Francis Adams
 Heat — 40.08s
 Semi Finals — 39.88s (→ did not advance)

Men's 4 × 400 m Relay 
 Mike Solomon, Charles Joseph, Horace Tuitt, and Joseph Coombs
 Heat — 3:03.54
 Final — 3:03.46 (→ 6th place)

Men's Long Jump
 George Swanston
 Qualification — 7.40m (→ did not advance)

Cycling

Two cyclists represented Trinidad and Tobago in 1976.

Sprint
 Leslie Rawlins — 23rd place

1000m time trial
 Anthony Sellier — 1:11.103 (→ 20th place)

Shooting

References

External links
Official Olympic Reports
International Olympic Committee results database

Nations at the 1976 Summer Olympics
1976
Summer Olympics